This is a list of the National Register of Historic Places listings in Brown County, Texas.

This is intended to be a complete list of properties listed on the National Register of Historic Places in Brown County, Texas. There are six properties listed on the National Register in the county. Two properties are listed as Recorded Texas Historic Landmarks (RTHLs) while another property includes two RTHLs.

Current listings

The locations of National Register properties may be seen in a mapping service provided.

|}

See also

National Register of Historic Places listings in Texas
Recorded Texas Historic Landmarks in Brown County

References

External links

Brown County, Texas
Brown County
Buildings and structures in Brown County, Texas